Richard Ellis Ford Matthews  (20 November 1921 – 19 February 1995) was a New Zealand plant virologist.

Biography
Matthews was born in Hamilton in 1921, and was educated at Mount Albert Grammar School in Auckland. He then attended Auckland University College, graduating with a Master of Science degree with second-class honours in 1942.

After serving in the 7th Antitank Regiment of the 2nd New Zealand Expeditionary Force in Italy from 1943 to 1945, Matthews undertook PhD studies at Emmanuel College, Cambridge, graduating in 1948. He was appointed senior mycologist at the New Zealand Department of Scientific and Industrial Research in 1954 and senior principal research officer in 1956. In 1962, he was appointed professor of microbiology at the University of Auckland, retiring in 1987.

Matthews was elected a Fellow of the Royal Society of New Zealand in 1962, and in 1978 he was awarded the Hector Medal. He was elected a Fellow of the Royal Society in 1974.  On 6 February 1988, Matthews was appointed a Member of the Order of New Zealand.

He died in Auckland on 19 February 1995.

References

1921 births
1995 deaths
People from Hamilton, New Zealand
People educated at Mount Albert Grammar School
University of Auckland alumni
New Zealand military personnel of World War II
Alumni of Emmanuel College, Cambridge
Academic staff of the University of Auckland
New Zealand microbiologists
New Zealand Fellows of the Royal Society
Fellows of the Royal Society of New Zealand
Members of the Order of New Zealand
20th-century New Zealand scientists
New Zealand phytopathologists
New Zealand virologists
20th-century agronomists